The Rolava is a left tributary of the Ohře river in the northwest of the Czech Republic.

It rises in the Czech part of the Ore Mountains near the border with Germany, in the territory of Přebuz. North of its source is the raised bog of Großer Kranichsee, whose waters the Rolava partly collects. During its course in a mainly southeasterly direction the river flows between Vysoká Pec and Nové Hamry, then through Nejdek, Smolné Pece and Nová Role. It then flows through Karlovy Vary from northwest to southeast and discharges into the Ohře.

References

Rivers of the Karlovy Vary Region
Rivers of the Ore Mountains